China: A Century of Revolution is a series of television documentary films about the history of China in the 20th century. Produced by Ambrica Productions for PBS, the films were written and directed by Sue Williams and first aired in the United States from 1989 to 1997. The first installment, China in Revolution, 1911–1949, was broadcast on September 27, 1989. The second installment, The Mao Years, 1949–1976, was broadcast on April 13, 1994. The third installment, Born Under the Red Flag, 1976–1997, was broadcast on July 9, 1997.

Williams began production on the documentary in 1985.

Home media
China was released on VHS by WinStar Home Video and Zeitgeist Films. A DVD box set for the series was later released by Zeitgeist Films and Kino Lorber on July 10, 2007.

References

External links
Official Ambrica site

1989 television films
1989 films
1994 television films
1994 films
1997 television films
1997 films
1989 documentary films
1994 documentary films
1997 documentary films
American film series
Documentary film series
Documentary films about China
Documentary films about revolutions
PBS original programming
Television film series
Works about Mao Zedong